Yael Abecassis (born  19 July 1967) is an Israeli actress and model.

Biography
Yael Abecassis was born in Ashkelon, Israel, to parents of Moroccan Jewish descent. Abecassis married Israeli actor Lior Miller in 1996 and has one child. They divorced in 2003. She is currently married to entrepreneur and philanthropist Ronny Douek. Abecassis is the daughter of Raymonde Abecassis, a Moroccan-Israeli singer and actress.

Modeling and acting career 
Yael Abecassis began modeling at the age of 14. She later branched into television and film, appearing in commercials and starring as Rivka in Kadosh, a 1999 retelling of The Dybbuk directed by Amos Gitai. In the 1990s, she starred as a host on Israeli television programs for children, and produced music videos for babies and young children. Towards the end of the 1990s, she left television to pursue a career as a dramatic actress. She starred in several Amos Gitai movies and has won favorable reviews, especially in France.

Film production
In 2012, Abecassis opened a film production company, Cassis Films. The company's first film, Aya, was one of five international shorts nominated for the 2015 Oscars.

Filmography
Rabin, the Last Day (2015)
A Borrowed Identity (2014)
Atlit (2014)
Hunting Elephants (2013), Dorit
Prisoners of War (2010), Talia Klein
Shiva (2008), Lili
Survivre avec les loups (2007)
Sans moi (2007), Marie
Papa (2005/II), Léa
Va, vis et deviens (2005), Yaël Harrari
Until Tomorrow Comes (2004), Daughter
Alila (2003), Gabi
Ballo a tre passi (2003)
Life Is Life (2003)
Miss Entebbe (2003), Elise
Bella ciao (2001), Nella
Maria, figlia del suo figlio (2000), Mary of Nazareth
Kadosh (1999), Rivka
Shabatot VeHagim (1999), Ella
Passeur d'enfants (1997), Yael 
L'enfant de la terre promise (1997), Yael
L'enfant d'Israel (1997)
Hakita Hameofefet (1995)
Ha-Yerusha (1993)
Zarim Balayla (1993)
Sipurei Tel-Aviv (1992), Sharona
Pour Sacha (1991), Judith

Filmography as self 

Shotetut
HaKaletet

See also
Women in Israel
Israeli cinema

References

External links 
 

1967 births
Living people
Israeli female models
Israeli film actresses
Israeli television actresses
Jewish Israeli actresses
Jewish female models
Israeli people of Moroccan-Jewish descent
People from Ashkelon
20th-century Moroccan Jews